Larissa Bonfante (March 27, 1931, Naples, Italy – August 23, 2019, New York City, New York) was an Italian-American classicist, Professor of Classics emerita at New York University and an authority on Etruscan language and culture.

Biography
Bonfante was born in Naples, the daughter of professor Giuliano Bonfante. She grew up in Princeton, NJ. Bonfante would go on to study fine arts and classics at Barnard College, earning her B.A. in 1954; she completed her M.A. in classics from the University of Cincinnati in 1957 and her Ph.D. in art history and archaeology at Columbia University in 1966. She studied at Columbia with Otto Brendel.  Bonfante received the Gold Medal Award for Distinguished Archaeological Achievement in 2007 from the Archaeological Institute of America. She was a founding member of the American section of the Istituto Nazionale di Studi Etruschi ed Italici. She edited the periodical publication Etruscan News that reported on the activities of the American section. In 2009 Bonfante was elected as a member of the American Philosophical Society.

Endowed lectureship
The Archaeological Institute of America created an endowment fund to raise monies to support a lecture in Bonfante's honor as part of its lecture program. The inaugural named lecture was delivered by Dr. Jean MacIntosh Turfa on March 21, 2021, for the Staten Island (NY) society of the AIA.

Selected publications
 1970. "Roman Triumphs and Etruscan Kings: The Changing Face of the Triumph." Journal of Roman Studies 60:49-66.
 1975. Etruscan dress. Baltimore: Johns Hopkins University Press. Reviews: American Journal of Archaeology 81.2:253-254
 1979. The Plays of Hrotswitha of Gandersheim. translator, with Alexandra Bonfante-Warren.
 1981. Out of Etruria : Etruscan influence north and south. Oxford: BAR. 
 (with Giuliano Bonfante) The Etruscan language: an introduction, 1983
 1986. ed. Etruscan life and afterlife: a handbook of Etruscan studies. Wayne State University Press.
 1989. "Nudity as a Costume in Classical Art." American Journal of Archaeology 93.4:543-70.
 1990. Reading The Past Etruscan. Berkeley: University of California Press.
 1997 Corpus Speculorum Etruscorum USA / 3, New York, the Metropolitan Museum of Art. Ames, Iowa: Iowa State University Press.
 2001. Italy and Cyprus in antiquity, 1500-450 BC : proceedings of an international symposium held at the Italian Academy for Advanced Studies in America at Columbia University, November 16–18, 2000. Nicosia: Costakis and Leto Severis Foundation.
 2006. (with Judith Swaddling) Etruscan myths. University of Texas Press.
 2006. (with Blair Fowlkes). Classical antiquities at New York University. Rome: "L'Erma" di Bretschneider.
 2011. The barbarians of ancient Europe: realities and interactions. Cambridge University Press.
 2013. The Plays of Hrotswitha of Gandersheim. Bilingual Edition.
 2016. The Collection of Antiquities of the American Academy in Rome.  University of Michigan Press.

Necrology
 "Larissa Bonfante morta a New York: l'archeologa era tra le maggiori specialiste di Etruschi" Il Messaggero (31 August 2019)
 "Addio all'archeologa napoletana Larissa Bonfante: fu insigne etruscologa" Il Mattino.it (31 August 2019)
 In memoriam statement published by the Archaeological Institute of America, authored by Jean MacIntosh Turfa (6 September 2019).
 "In Memoriam: Larissa Bonfante (1931–2019)" in Etruscan and Italic Studies 22:1-2 (12 Nov 2019) authored by Nancy de Grummond.
 Commemoration in Etruscan News v. 22 (Winter 2020) published by New York University.

References

External links
 Faculty page, New York University
 Institute for Italic and Etruscan Studies
 Academia.edu profile

1931 births
2019 deaths
Linguists of Etruscan
New York University faculty
Italian archaeologists
Italian women archaeologists
Barnard College alumni
University of Cincinnati alumni
Columbia Graduate School of Arts and Sciences alumni
Classical archaeologists
Classical scholars of New York University
Women classical scholars